is one of the oldest Shintō shrines in the Kantō region, located in Kuki, Saitama (formerly Washimiya), Japan.

History
The oldest record of the shrine was found in the Azuma Kagami, the official historical record for the Kamakura Shogunate. It had the patronage of the Imperial family, and even Shōgun Tokugawa Ieyasu. Various folk-culture and performing art events, including the Saibara-Kagura Festival are held here. Its traditional dance handed down through generations has been designated as a national intangible folk-culture asset. The shrine also houses several ancient relics.

During the New Year season, the shrine receives no fewer than 100,000 visitors.

The torii gate of the shrine collapsed in 2018.

Otaku pilgrimages

The August 2007 issue of the Newtype magazine ran an article on the various locales featuring in the popular anime and manga Lucky Star, and provided directions on how to reach these places from the otaku hotspot Akihabara, including the Washinomiya Shrine which had its torii shown in the opening sequence and featured the Hiiragi sisters working as miko in the anime.

Shortly afterwards, massive otaku pilgrimages to the shrine became the most widely reported consequence of the feature's publication. It became a place teeming with photographers trying to replicate scenes from the anime, cosplayers wandering around, and prayer plaques ridden with anime drawings and strange prayers like "Konata is my wife".

The head of the shrine raised concerns that the visitors were worshipping "deities" other than the shrine's own. The locals were divided on the situation, with some suggesting that it was good for the shrine to have so many worshippers, and some being concerned about the town's security. The visiting otakus, although considered unusual, were generally described as being well-mannered. Eventually, many local residents embraced the otaku, with some profiting from the new traffic and influx of people. This social phenomenon was subsequently satirized in the twenty-first episode of the anime.

On December 2, 2007, Kagami Yoshimizu and 4 cast members of Lucky Star held a brunch and "official" visit of the shrine. A highlight of the visit was a guided tour by the voice actors of the "Hiiragi sisters" (Emiri Kato and Kaori Fukuhara) leading the other two VA's and fans around the real shrine.

References

Further reading

External links

 Official website
 Photo Gallery - Washinomiya Shrine
 Lucky Star "pilgrimages"
 "Washinomiya station course" Walking map of sightseeing in Kuki city (Kuki city homepage, Japanese PDF files)

Beppyo shrines
Shinto shrines in Saitama Prefecture